The India women's national football team is controlled by the All India Football Federation and represents India at women's international football competitions. Under the global jurisdiction of FIFA and governed in Asia by the AFC. India is also part of the South Asian Football Federation. The team was one of the best in Asia in the mid-1970s to early 1980s, when they became runners-up in the 1979 and the 1983 AFC Women's Asian Cup.

The Indian women's national team is yet to participate in the FIFA Women's World Cup and the Olympic Games. The present ranking of the team according to the FIFA Women's World Rankings is 57th, the 11th-best team in Asia.

History

1970–1991
Football for women in Asia started later compared to their male counterparts. The seed of women's football in India was planted in the early 1970s. The first manager was Sushil Bhattacharya, in 1975 and from 1975 until 1991, the administration of the game was in the hands of the Women's Football Federation of India (WFFI) which comes under the Asian Ladies' Football Confederation (ALFC) that had recognition from neither FIFA nor AFC (Asian Football Confederation). Both organizations continuously tried to dissuade Asian countries from sending teams to these tournaments for which the first few editions of AFC Women's Asian Cup other unofficial tournaments seen very few teams to participate and thus the 1980 Calicut edition of Asian Championship featured two Indian teams (India N & India S), Western Australia, Taiwan, Hong Kong and Malaysia. India did well enough in all these unofficial tournaments under Sushil Bhattacharya and India S become runners-up at Calicut. In the next edition of 1981 India achieved third position, defeated by Thailand and again became runners-up in the 1983 edition losing to Thailand again. This was the best chapter for the Indian women team in the Asian platform as since 1983 the performance declined along with mismanagement in the federation and failing to promote the games at all level in every state of India. The game was administered by WFFI from 1975 until the early 1990s, when they were absorbed into the AIFF as despite their impressive display at the Asian level, women's football in India went into the state of gloom by the end of the eighties due to the previous federation failure of promoting the women's football to the level it had deserved.

1991–2009
But the AIFF too did very less to lift the women's football from their meager condition. It was the time when FIFA conceptualized and organised FIFA Women's World Cup in 1991 and International Olympic Committee started the women's competition at 1996 Summer Olympics. Time and again, the AIFF officials stated that lifting the standard of women's football to the level of their Asian counterparts was their chief aim but they never backed up their words with actions. AIFF was treating women's football as an extra burden was a fact which was hidden from no one but it became evident when they failed to sponsor the team's first foreign trip in 1997 to Germany before the Asian Championships. Eventually, the trip was made possibly with the help of the German Football Association and NRI's living in Germany.

1998 Asian Games was first participation for the national team but came out to be nightmare as they defeated by Chinese Taipei with a score line of 1–13 in the second match and again on the 3rd match they faced the biggest defeat in the history by China PR with an embarrassing scoreline of 0–16.

The women's game reached a new low in June 2009 when FIFA delisted the side from its world rankings for being out of action for more than 18 months. From 1991 to 2010 the performance of the Indian team was very poor, participating in just 5 editions of Asian Championships, 2003 as their last participation in which they faced a repeated embarrassing defeat with 0–12 scoreline from China PR. FIFA Women's World Cup and Olympics participation is yet be a reality for the Indian team.

2010–present
After 2009 sanction by FIFA, the AIFF started to put their minds in place to better the condition of the national team and women's football, which led to commencing SAFF Women's Championship and also including women's football in the South Asian Games. The women's team resumed playing on 29 January 2010 after nearly a year-long hiatus. Indian team earn massive success in SAFF competitions. Winning the SAFF Women's Championship four times in row without losing a single game. Additionally they won two gold medals at South Asian Games.

On 17 December 2014, AIFF Secretary Kushal Das stated that the goal for women's football from 2014 to 2017 was to increase the ranking of the India senior team to the top 40s and the top 8 in Asia, start a professional women's league by 2015, and to qualify for both the U19 and U16 versions of the AFC championships. which is now far from reality as India is 60th by FIFA World Rankings and 13th among the Asian countries and yet to qualify for AFC Women's Asian Cup since 2003, FIFA Women's World Cup and Olympic Games.

They participated in the qualifiers for the 2012 Olympics in March 2011. In their first match they beat rivals and group hosts Bangladesh 3–0. In the second round India Women played Uzbekistan where they tied the first match 1–1 but lost the second leg 1–5 and were officially knocked out. Again for Rio 2016 Olympics they participated in the AFC qualifiers, first match was a win defeating Sri Lanka with score 4–1 then shocking defeat from Myanmar with a score line 0–7 which led the way out from the qualifiers.

India participated for the second time at the Asian games in 2014, but the condition was not better than the previous participation, 16 years back in 1998. Though India defeated Maldives easily with 15–0 score, but a similar fate of Maldives was faced by them in the next two matches where they were defeated by both South Korea and Thailand with the same score of 0–10.

In August 2018, Indian women national team was invited to participate in Cotif Tournament where clubs and national and autonomous teams participate every year since 1984, held at Valencia, Spain. 2018 Cotif was 35th Anniversary of the tournament. At this tournament they faced 3 Spanish club teams and Morocco. First lost to Fundación Albacete, 1–4, then to Levante UD, 0–5, then the Moroccan side defeated India with a score 5–1, but on the last match India played with maturity, though lost to Madrid CFF with 0–1 score.

In November 2018, India qualified to the second round of 2020 AFC Women's Olympic Qualifying Tournament for the first time since the qualifying tournament started for the 2008 Summer Olympics.

For preparation of 2020 Olympics 2nd round qualifiers India played two matches each against Hong Kong and Indonesia winning all four of them 5–2 & 1–0 against Hong Kong and 3–0 & 2–0 against Indonesia respectively. Following these matches India played at the Women's Gold Cup organised at home, where they won their first match against Iran by 1–0 but lost next two matches to Nepal and Myanmar by 1–2 and 0–2 respectively and failed to reach the final.

Team image

Nicknames
The India women's national football team has been known or nicknamed as "The Blue Tigresses".

Media coverage
There is unfortunately no television coverage for the team currently, while some of the games are streamed online on Facebook Live or YouTube.

Results and fixtures

The following is a list of match results in the last 12 months, as well as any future matches that have been scheduled.

Legend

‡ represents FIFA non "A" international, points will not be considered for FIFA ranking.

2022

2023

 Official Fixtures and Results – The-AIFF.com
 Fixtures and Results – Soccerway.com

Coaching staff

Current personnel

Manager history

, after the match against .

Note: Only FIFA A matches considered.

Players

Current squad

Recent call-ups
The following players were named to a squad in the last 12 months.

INJ Withdrew due to injury
PRE Preliminary squad / standby
RET Retired from the national team
SUS Serving suspension
WD Player withdrew from the squad due to non-injury issue.

Previous squads

 AFC Women's Asian Cup squads
 2022 AFC Women's Asian Cup squad
 Asian Games squads
 1998 Asian Games Squad
 2014 Asian Games Squad

 SAFF Women's Championship
 2016 SAFF Women's Championship Squad
 South Asian Games
 2016 South Asian Games Squad

Records

*Players in bold are still active, at least at club level.

Most capped players
Top 5 appearances

Top goalscorers
Top 4 goalscorers

Captains

Competitive record

FIFA Women's World Cup

*Draws include knockout matches decided on penalty kicks.

AFC Women's Asian Cup

Notes: 

*Draws include knockout matches decided on penalty kicks.
At 1979 AFC Asia Cup India placed two teams, India Senior(India S) and India Novice(India N), other version called as India North and India South.

Asian Games

 DNP: did not participate
 DNQ: did not qualify
Bold Positions show best finish in the tournaments.

SAFF Women's Championship
India has won the SAFF Women's Championship five times in a row.

South Asian Games
India has won the South Asian Games three times.

Red border indicates, India had hosted the games.

Other tournaments

Gold Cup

Turkish Women's Cup

International Women's Football Tournament

FIFA World Ranking

 Best Ranking   Best Mover   Worst Ranking   Worst Mover

See also

Women's youth teams
 India U-20
 India U-17
 Sport in India
 Football in India
 Women's football in India
Miscellaneous
 Indian Women's League
 India women's football championship
 List of India women's national football team hat-tricks
 Women's association football around the world

References

Further reading

Taylor & Francis: Soccer and Society (2005). The gendered kick: Women's soccer in twentieth century India, Soccer & Society, 6:2–3, 270–284, DOI: 10.1080/14660970500106469.

External links
Official website the-AIFF.com 
Profile at FIFA.com 
India women's national football team picture at Hindustan Times

 
Asian women's national association football teams
National